Walter Fielder (6 March 1899 – 7 January 1968) was an English cricketer. He was a right-handed batsman who played for Hampshire. He was born in Fareham, Hampshire and died in Sarisbury Green.

Fielder made a single first-class appearance, during the 1923 County Championship, against Leicestershire. As a tailender, he scored 2 not out in the only innings in which he batted, as well as bowling seven overs at 0-26.

External links
Walter Fielder at Cricket Archive 

1899 births
1968 deaths
English cricketers
Hampshire cricketers
People from Fareham